The 1988 Argentina rugby union tour of France  was a series of eight matches played by the Argentina national rugby union team in October and November 1988.

Matches

 Burgundy XV: Lafond ( T.Catinot); Ponel, Bordenave, Martins, Carteau; Mesnel, Boudet; Brunat, Pronovi, Monteil; Pluss.Theroin; Fayard ( T.Fuertes), Bouillot, Romand.Argentina: A.Scolni; C.Mendy, F.Turnes, M.Loffreda, D.Cuesta Silva; R.Madero, D.Baetti; J.Allen (capt.), M.Carreras, P.Garretón; A.Iachetti, E.Branca; D.Cash, J.Angelillo, S.Dengra. 

 Auvergne XV :Langlade; García, Nicol, Blanc, Saint André; Trille, Hondagne ( T.Pradier); Lecompte, Arthapignet, Janeczek; Deslandes, D.Gaby ( T.P.Gaby); Heyer, Rizon, Marocco.Argentina: A.Scolni; D.Cuesta Silva, M.Loffreda, F.Turnes, C.Mendy; R.Madero, D.Baetti; M.Bertranou, M.Carreras, J.Allen (capt.); E.Branca A.Iachetti; P.Urbano, J.Angelillo, D.Cash. 

 Catalan XV: Tresene; Impinna, Enrique, Bonneval, Nivet; Amalric, Pages; Christaud-Braize, Alegre, Bey; Beraud, Autones ( T.Campredon); Fontaine, Fabre, Rebujent.Argentina: S.Salvat; J.Soler, M.Loffreda, S.Mesón, D.Cuesta Silva; R.Madero, F.Gómez; P.Garreton, J.Allen (capt.), F.Conti; P.Buabse, M.Valesani; P.Urbano, A.Courreges, D.González. 

Périgord-Agenais XV: Berot; Bonneval, Martini, Carbonnel, Gleize; Peuchlestrade ( T.Authier), Modin; Janik, Carminatti, Gratton; Erbani, Pujade; Galesio, Dubroca (capt.), Tolot. Argentina: S.Salvat; G.Terán; F.Turres, M.Loffreda, C.Mendy; R.Madero, F.Silvestre; J.Allen (capt.), G.Milano ( T.Bertranou), F.Conti; E.Branca, A.Iachetti; D.Cash, J.Angelillo, S.Dengra.

 Poitou-Charentes XV: Lafond ( Bichetton); Daguzan, Le Bourhis, Lespinasse, Peytavin; Barboteau, Mazille; Dupiney, Maffini ( Cot), Courtiols; Picard, Mougeot; Garuet, Ducluzeau, Marocco.Argentina: A.Scolni; G.Terán, S.Mesón, P.Garzón, J.Soler; D.Dominguez, A.Soares Gache; M.Bertranou, M.Valesani, M.Carreras; E.Branca, P.Buabse; P.Urbano, A.Courreges, D.González.

Notes

Sources 

 

Argentina national rugby union team tours
Rugby union tours of France
tour
tour